Sequential proportional approval voting (SPAV) or reweighted approval voting (RAV) is an electoral system that extends the concept of approval voting to a multiple winner election. It is a simplified version of proportional approval voting. Proposed by Danish statistician Thorvald N. Thiele in the early 1900s, it was used (with adaptations for party lists) in Sweden for a short period from 1909-1921, and was replaced by a cruder "party-list" style system as it was easier to calculate.

Description
Sequential Proportional Approval Voting (SPAV) uses Approval Voting ballots to elect multiple winners equitably by selecting a candidate in each round and then reweighing the approvals for the subsequent rounds.

Each ballot is assigned a value equal to the reciprocal of one more than the number of candidates approved on that ballot who have been designated as elected. Each ballot is counted at its current value as a vote for all continuing candidates approved on that ballot. The candidate with the most votes in the round is elected. The process continues until the number of elected candidates is equal to the number of seats to be filled.

At each stage, the unelected candidate with the highest approval score is elected. Then the value of each voter’s ballot is set at  where s is the number of candidates approved on that ballot who were already elected, until the required number of candidates is elected. This reweighting is based on the D'Hondt method (Jefferson method). Other weighting formulas such as Sainte-Lague method may be used while still being referred to as SPAV.

There is an incentive towards tactical voting where a voter may withhold approval from candidates who are likely to be elected in any case, as with cumulative voting and the single non-transferable vote.

It is a much computationally simpler algorithm than harmonic proportional approval voting, permitting votes to be counted either by hand or by computer, rather than requiring a computer to determine the outcome of all but the simplest elections.

When comparing Sequential Proportional Approval Voting to Single Transferable Vote, SPAV is better at selecting more central candidates, that represent all the voters, where STV is better at mimicking the distribution of the voters.

Example

For this example, there is an election for a committee with 3 winners. There are six candidates from two main parties: A, B, and C from one party, and X, Y, and Z from another party. About 2/3 of the voters support the first party, and the other roughly 1/3 of the voters support the second party. Each voter casts their vote by selecting the candidates they support. The following table shows the results of the votes. Each row starts by saying how many voters voted in that way and marks each candidate that group of voters supported. The bottom row shows the number of votes each candidate received.

Because Candidate C has the most support, they are the first winner, w1, and their vote is not counted in later rounds. For the second round, anyone who voted for Candidate C has their vote counted as only 1/2. Below is the chart for round 2. A second column on the left has been added to indicate the weight of each ballot.

Despite Candidates A and B having so many votes in the first round, Candidate X is the second winner, w2, because not as many of the votes for Candidate X were halved. In round 3, anyone who voted for either Candidates C or X has their vote count 1/2, and anyone who voted for both has their vote count 1/3. If anyone had voted for neither, their vote would remain at 1. Below is that table.

Candidate B is the third and final winner, w3. The final result has 2/3 winners from the party that had about 2/3 of the votes, and 1/3 winner from the party that had about 1/3 of the votes. If approval voting had been used instead, the final committee would be all three candidates from the first party, as they had the highest three vote totals without scaling.

Properties 
Sequential-PAV satisfies the fairness property called justified representation whenever the committee size is at most 5, but might violate it when the committee size is at least 6.

SPAV is not precinct summable, and requires the ballot information to be centralized before a complete winner set can be determined.

See also
Satisfaction approval voting
 Reweighted range voting
 Approval voting
 Single transferable vote

References

Semi-proportional electoral systems
Cardinal electoral systems
Approval voting